Astrid Gjertsen (14 September 192817 June 2020) was a Norwegian-Danish politician who served as a member of the Norwegian Parliament as a member of the Conservative Party from 1969 to 1989. From 1981 to 1986, she served as the Minister of Consumer Affairs and Administration. In 2013, Gjertsen was named as the ninth most important woman in Norwegian history by Verdens Gang.

Early life
Astrid Gjertsen was born on 14 September 1928, in Horsens, Denmark, to Senius Spaabæk and Helga Mogensen. She graduated from high school in Horsens in 1946.

In 1945, she worked for the Youth Red Cross where she met John Herbert Gjertsen, a Norwegian who had been a prisoner of war in a concentration camp during World War II since 1942 for his involvement in a resistance movement. On 21 September 1946, she married Gjertsen. During her marriage, she lived in Oslo, Norway, and later in Borøya, Aust-Agder, Norway.

Career

Local politics
In 1967, Gjertsen was elected to the Tvedestrand municipal council and served until 1975. From 1972 to 1975, she served as the leader of the Conservatives in Tvedestrand.

Parliament
In 1969, she was elected as a deputy representative to the Norwegian Parliament from Aust-Agder, and later as a parliamentary representative in 1973, as a member of the Conservative Party. From 1978 to 1982, she served as the 2nd Deputy Chairman of the Right.

In 1974, she served as a deputy representative to the United Nations General Assembly. In 1978, she served as a member of the parliamentary delegation to the Nordic Council.

On 14 October 1981, she became the Minister of State in the Ministry of Consumers and Administration. She was one of four women in Kåre Willoch's cabinet. During her tenure, the telephone monopoly was disbanded; she supported deregulation, and supported allowing for longer shopping hours and Sunday shopping.

On 18 April 1986, she resigned from her ministry position and was convicted for turning in NOK 32,061 worth of fraudulent taxi receipts. She was given a 45-day suspended sentence and paid the money back; the punishment was higher than usual due to her political position. Gjertsen stopped being a deputy representative in 1989.

Later life
In a 2013 ranking compiled by the political editors of Verdens Gang, Gjertsen was rated the ninth most important woman in Norwegian history. On 17 June 2020, she died in Bærum, Norway.

References

1928 births
2020 deaths
20th-century Norwegian politicians
20th-century Norwegian women politicians
Conservative Party (Norway) politicians
Danish emigrants to Norway
Government ministers of Norway
Members of the Storting
Women government ministers of Norway
Women members of the Storting